Teriomima subpunctata, the white buff, is a butterfly in the family Lycaenidae. It is found along the coast of Kenya and in Tanzania (from the coast inland to the Usambara and Uluguru districts). The habitat consists of coastal and lowland forests at altitudes ranging from sea level to 1,200 metres.

The larvae feed on tree lichens.

References

Butterflies described in 1887
Poritiinae
Butterflies of Africa
Taxa named by William Forsell Kirby